Bhooloka Rambai is a 1958 Indian Tamil-language film, directed by D. Yoganand and produced by Ashoka Pictures. The film stars Gemini Ganesan and Anjali Devi, with P. S. Veerappa, M. N. Nambiar, Rajasulochana, K. A. Thangavelu and A. Karunanidhi in supporting roles. It was released on 14 January 1958.

Plot

Cast 
 Gemini Ganesan as Prince Bhuvanendran
 Anjali Devi as Princess Boologa Rambai
 P. S. Veerappa as General Veera Kesari
 M. N. Nambiar as Puththi Sigamani
 Rajasulochana as Princess Meghala
 K. A. Thangavelu as Varnam
 E. V. Saroja as Poongavanam
 A. Karunanidhi as Mahodharan
 P. S. Venkatachalam as Boopathy
 E. R. Sahadevan as Nagasooran
 K. Sairam as Sira Kesari
 M. Saroja as Sornam
 C. K. Saraswathi as Witch Rangamma
 K. Natarajan as Bhuvanendran's father
 Lakshmi Prabha as Bhuvanendran's mother
 Reeta as Maya Mohini

Soundtrack 
Music was composed by C. N. Pandurangan and lyrics were written by Yaanai Vaithyanathaiyar, Pavalar Velayudhasamy, Suratha, Kovi Manisekaran, Mugavai Rajamanickam, Ku. Ma. Balasubramaniam, Ku. Sa. Krishnamoorthy, Villiputhan, Puratchidasan and P. K. Atkondan. B. Saroja Devi danced for the song Thean Pole Thedi Vaa, voiced by Jikki.

Release 
Bhoologa Rambai was initially scheduled to release on 10 January 1958, but pushed to four days later.

References

External links 
 

1950s Tamil-language films
1958 films
Films directed by D. Yoganand
Films scored by C. N. Pandurangan
Indian black-and-white films